Kurucaoluk can refer to:

 Kurucaoluk, Burhaniye
 Kurucaoluk, Susurluk